This is a list of former Central Coast Mariners W-League players. The team played in the first two seasons of the Australian W-League (2008-09 and 2009) and had a number of notable players, coming second in the 2009 W-League Premiership. The team has not played since the 2009 W-League season due to a lack of funding.

Internationals

 Caitlin Cooper
 Rachael Doyle
 Gillian Foster
 Lyndsay Glohe
 Kelly Golebiowski
 Michelle Heyman
 Jenna Kingsley
 Ellyse Perry
 Teresa Polias
 Taryn Rockall
 Renee Rollason
 Kyah Simon
 Kendall Fletcher
 Jillian Loyden

List of players

 
Association football player non-biographical articles
Lists of soccer players by club in Australia